Fenuki Aisea Tupou (born May 2, 1985) is a former American football guard. He was drafted by the Philadelphia Eagles in the fifth round of the 2009 NFL Draft. He played college football at Oregon.

Early years
Tupou was raised in Antelope, California, where he attended Center High School as a two-way lineman. He went on to attend Sierra College for two years, earning a Junior College All-American honorable mention in 2005. Tupou was recruited by Oregon, where he eventually committed. He redshirted in 2006, before starting 23 games at offensive tackle for the Ducks over the course of his junior and senior year, earning All-Pacific-10 honors both seasons.

Professional career

Philadelphia Eagles
Tupou was drafted by the Philadelphia Eagles in the fifth round of the 2009 NFL Draft. He signed a 4-year contract with the team on June 6, 2009. He was placed on the injured reserve list on September 5, 2009. He was waived on September 4, 2010, and re-signed to the team's practice squad on September 13. His practice squad contract expired at the conclusion of the season, so he was re-signed to a future contract on January 13, 2011.

Tupou was waived on September 3, 2011, during final roster cuts.

New Orleans
Tupou was signed to the Saints practice squad on October 3, 2011. He was re-signed on January 18, 2012. He was waived/injured on August 19, 2012, and subsequently reverted to injured reserve on August 22.

Personal life
His brother, Christian Tupou was a defensive lineman for the USC Trojans. He went undrafted in the 2012 NFL Draft, and was signed for training camp by the San Diego Chargers. Their cousin, Viliami Moala, currently plays for the California Golden Bears.

References

External links

Philadelphia Eagles bio
Oregon Ducks bio
NFLDraftScout.com bio

1985 births
Living people
American football offensive tackles
Oregon Ducks football players
American people of Tongan descent
Players of American football from Sacramento, California
Sierra Wolverines football players
Arizona Rattlers players